Parysatis (5th-century BC) was a powerful Persian queen, consort of Darius II and had a large influence during the reign of Artaxerxes II.

Biography
Parysatis was the daughter of Emperor Artaxerxes I of Persia and Andia of Babylon. She was the half-sister of Xerxes II, Sogdianus, and Darius II. She married her half-brother Darius II and had 13 sons, of which four survived to adulthood: Artaxerxes II, Cyrus the Younger, Ostanes, and Oxathres. and one daughter -  Amestris.

Influence at the Persian Court
Parysatis was very powerful and had a network of spies and informants. Ctesias, who was her physician, mentions in his books how she would identify and order the execution of various people who were a threat to the throne. Parysatis was very savvy and succeeded in assisting Darius II's ascent to the throne, even though he was a bastard and not a legitimate child. Ctesias records that he was very dependent on her counsel.

In addition, she is mentioned to have held a lot of land and villages in Syria, Media and Babylon. There also remains a record of the taxes paid directly to her and to Ea-bullissu, the servant who was in charge of managing her holdings and tax collections.

Supporting Cyrus the Younger

Her favorite son was Cyrus, and it was on account of her influence that he was given supreme command in western Anatolia as a teenager in around 407 BC.  When her husband died, she supported Cyrus. When Cyrus was defeated in the Battle of Cunaxa, she blamed the satrap Tissaphernes for his death, and thus had him assassinated not long after.

According to the chapter on Artaxerxes II in Plutarch's Life, a young Persian soldier named Mithridates unknowingly struck Cyrus the Younger during the Battle of Cunaxa, making him fall from his horse, dazed.  Some eunuchs found Cyrus and tried to bring him to safety, but a Caunian among the king's camp followers struck a vein behind his knee with a dart, making him fall and strike his head on a stone, whereupon he died. Unwisely, Mithridates boasted of killing Cyrus in the court, and Parysatis had him executed by scaphism. She likewise got vengeance on Masabates, the king's eunuch, who had cut off Cyrus' hand and head, by winning him from her son Artaxerxes in a game of dice and having him flayed alive.

Rivalry with Stateira
Stateira was the wife of Artaxerxes II. Her brother, Terituchmes, loved one of his half-sisters more than his intended bride - Amestris, Darius II and Parysatis's daughter. Terituchmes tried to start a rebellion, and Parysatis had all the family killed and only spared the life of Stateira at the request of her husband.

After Artaxerxes II took control and Cryus's attempt to seize the throne failed, the queen mother Parysatis and queen consort Stateira both tried to be the key political influence on the king, making them bitter rivals.

Reportedly the intense hatred between the two women led Parysatis to encourage Artaxerxes II to take on concubines in order to hurt his wife. Stateira also publicly spoke up against the cruelties of the queen mother at the Persian court. For example, she criticized the brutal treatment of the eunuch Masabates, intensifying her conflict with Parysatis.

Finally, Parysatis had Stateira murdered. Classical sources give different reasons for this deed. According to one version, Parysatis wanted to save the life of the Spartan commander Clearchus and his fellow-generals, who had been taken prisoner by Tissaphernes, but Stateira had succeeded in persuading her husband to execute the prisoners. Therefore, Parysatis is supposed to have poisoned Stateira. Plutarch, in his biography of Artaxerxes II, did not believe this story. According to another tradition, Parysatis murdered her daughter-in-law because she realized that her son only felt true love for his wife. Plutarch reports that Parysatis performed the assassination with the help of a loyal servant named Gigis. She carved a bird with a poisoned knife in such a way that only one half of the animal was mixed with the poison. This half was served to Stateira when they were dining together. The poisoned meal caused the painful death of Stateira.

Artaxerxes was enraged and tried to capture Gigis, who was being hidden in Parysatis's quarters. Eventually, she was captured when she visited her family and was executed.  Parysatis was banished to Babylon, but returned afterwards to continue to provide advice and counsel to the king.  She advised him to marry his daughters Amestris and Atossa, to continue her influence over him, as they were less experienced in court.

In popular culture

 Asteroid 888 Parysatis, discovered by Max Wolf is named after her.

 Jane Dieulafoy wrote a novel called Parysatis in 1890. It was later turned into a play with instrumental music by Camille Saint-Saëns in 1902.

 James Ensor created an etching called  (Queen Parysatis flaying a eunuch), showing the execution of Masabates

References

Additional Reading 
 
 
 

5th-century BC women
Queens of the Achaemenid Empire
5th-century BC Iranian people
Darius II